The following lists events that happened in 1942 in Iceland.

Incumbents
Monarch - Kristján X
Prime Minister – Hermann Jónasson, Ólafur Thors, Björn Þórðarson

Events

Births

9 January – Eysteinn Björnsson, writer
23 January – Sighvatur Kristinn Björgvinsson, politician.
11 June – Jón Halldór Kristjánsson, politician
12 August – Þorsteinn Gylfason, philosopher (d. 2005)
4 October – Jóhanna Sigurðardóttir, politician 
21 October – Ingibjörg Haraldsdóttir, poet and translator (d. 2016)
2 December – Anna G. Jónasdóttir, political scientist

Deaths

References

 
1940s in Iceland
Iceland
Iceland
Years of the 20th century in Iceland